The 1983  Polish SuperCup was the 1st ever Polish SuperCup (which would later be an annual Polish football match played between the reigning winners of the Ekstraklasa and Polish Cup) to be contested. 

It was held on 30 July 1983 between the 1982–83 Ekstraklasa champions Lech Poznań and the 1982–83 Polish Cup winners Lechia Gdańsk at the home of the Polish Cup winners Lechia, the Stadion MOSiR in Gdańsk. 
Due to this being the inaugural SuperCup it was both teams first appearance in the competition.

Lechia won 1–0 to win the SuperCup title.

History

The idea of a Polish SuperCup came from the annual cup competition held in England between the league champions and the FA Cup winners, with the two teams playing for the FA Community Shield. The first edition was to be held between Szombierki Bytom and Legia Warsaw with the date scheduled to be on 22 June 1980. The fixture however never took place, either due to sporting reasons or geopolitical, social and economic reasons at the time, and the implementation of a SuperCup was not tried again for three years.

The idea was thought of again in 1983 when third division side Lechia Gdańsk unexpectedly won the Polish Cup. Activists of Lechia pushed for the creation of the SuperCup, and with both Lechia and the Champions of Poland, Lech, both having a week available for a game before the start of the following season agreed to hold the inaugural SuperCup competition.

While the game was seen as an entertaining spectacle and was enjoyed by the crowd in Gdańsk, it was not until 1987 when the Polish Football Association with the help of the Gloria Victis Foundation (who helped fund the competition while the cups proceeds went to the foundation), before the SuperCup became an annual competition in Poland.

Match

Trophy
The trophy was funded by the Katowice Daily Sport newspaper and was made by miners from the Szombierki Coal Mine out of a lump of coal. After Lechia won the trophy it was displayed in the club's conference room, due to this also being where the Pomeranian Football Association held their meetings. At some point the trophy was lost, it was not found again until 2014 in a slightly damaged condition and underwent renovation works. Currently the trophy is on display in the Lechia Museum at Stadion Gdańsk.

See also
1982–83 Ekstraklasa 
1982–83 Polish Cup

References

1983
1982–83 in Polish football
Sport in Gdańsk